Nicola Padoin (born 24 February 1979) is an Italian footballer who plays as a midfielder for Foligno.

Padoin left for Empoli F.C. in co-ownership deal in 1999 from A.C. Milan.

He played two games in the 2002–03 Serie A for Empoli F.C.

In the 2006–07 Serie B his dramatic winning goal in the 91st minute of the last regular season game against Juventus F.C. saved Spezia Calcio from relegation.

On 31 August 2009 Padoin returned to Spezia Calcio. On 21 October 2011 Padoin was signed by Calcio Lecco 1912. On 30 December 2011 Padoin left for Foligno. Lecco got Paolo Castellazzi, Matteo Cavagna and Ivan Merli Sala in exchange.

References

External links
 

1979 births
Living people
Italian footballers
Italy youth international footballers
Serie A players
Serie B players
A.C. Prato players
Empoli F.C. players
Spezia Calcio players
A.C. Reggiana 1919 players
S.S.D. Sanremese Calcio players
A.S.D. Castel di Sangro Calcio players
Association football midfielders